The Scurry Gold Cup is an original classic greyhound competition currently run at Perry Barr Stadium. 

It was run at Clapton Stadium from 1928 until its closure in 1973.  The event moved to Slough Stadium in 1974 which consequently closed in 1986.  The third move resulted in Catford Stadium hosting the race from 1987 until yet another closure forced the race to end in 2002. After a two-year wait, a new home was finally found at Perry Barr Stadium until 2009 when the GRA switched the competition to sister track Belle Vue Stadium. 

With the closure of Belle Vue in 2020 the future of the competition was unknown but the British Greyhound Breeders Forum stepped in to sponsor the race (held at Harlow Stadium for two years) before it returned to Perry Barr in 2021.

Venues & Distances 
1928–1973 (Clapton, 400 y)
1974–1974 (Slough, 475 y)
1975–1978 (Slough, 434 m) 
1979–1986 (Slough, 442 m) 
1987–2002 (Catford, 385 m)
2005–2008 (Perry Barr, 275 m) 
2009–2019 (Belle Vue, 260 m)
2020–2020 (Harlow, 238 m)
2021–2022 (Perry Barr, 275 m)

Past winners

Sponsors
2002–2002 (Brake Brothers)
2018–2019 (BAPP Group of Companies)
2020–2020 (British Greyhound Breeders Forum)
2021–2022 (Arena Racing Company)

References

Greyhound racing competitions in the United Kingdom
Recurring sporting events established in 1928
Sports competitions in Manchester
Sport in the London Borough of Lewisham
Greyhound racing in London